Karen Leslie Carr is an American scholar and McNaughton Rosebush Professor of Liberal Studies and Professor of Religious Studies at Lawrence University.
She is known for her works on nihilism and philosophy of religion.

Bibliography
 The Banalization of Nihilism: Twentieth-Century Responses to Meaninglessness, SUNY Press, 1992
 The Sense Of Antirationalism: The Religious Thought Of Zhuangzi And Kierkegaard, with Philip J. Ivanhoe, CreateSpace, 2010

References

21st-century American philosophers
Philosophers of nihilism
Continental philosophers
Living people
Oberlin College alumni
Stanford University alumni
Lawrence University faculty
Philosophers of religion
Year of birth missing (living people)
Christian continental philosophers and theologians